Scirpophaga adunctella is a moth in the family Crambidae. It was described by Fu-Qiang Chen, Shi-Mei Song and Chun-Sheng Wu in 2006. It is found in China in Yunnan and Xizang.

The wingspan is 30–38 mm. Both the forewings and hindwings are white, females with a pale ochreous anal tuft.

References

Moths described in 2006
Schoenobiinae
Moths of Asia